Amaranthus tuberculatus, commonly known as roughfruit amaranth, rough-fruited water-hemp, tall waterhemp, or common waterhemp, is a species of flowering plant.  It is a summer annual broadleaf with a germination period that lasts several months.
Tall waterhemp has been reported as a weed in 40 of 50 U.S. states.

Morphology
A distinguishing characteristic of tall waterhemp that sets it apart from similar members of the genus Amaranthus is the lack of hair on its stems and leaves.  This characteristic gives the plant a bright, glossy appearance. 
 
The leaves of tall waterhemp tend to be long and narrow.

The stem is typically erect and slender and can be up to three feet long.  The color of the stem is green or red. 
 
Tall waterhemp is a dioecious plant.  The seedhead branches in the female are numerous, short, and smooth.  The male seedhead branches are fewer, longer, and more slender than those of the female.

The species has terminal spike inflorescences and very short bracts with simple to highly branched flowers. Seed produced is reddish to black and less than 1/32 inch in diameter.

Geographic distribution
Tall waterhemp is native to North America. It is believed to have originally had a range north of Missouri and Tennessee to the Great Lakes.  It is now found in 40 states but is most common in the Great Plains and Great Lakes regions.

Habitat
Tall waterhemp predominantly grows in wet habitats, such as ponds, marshes, lakes, creeks, and other riparian zones.  It also thrives along roadways and railroads as well as agricultural fields.  It can grow in a variety of climates, as evidenced by its widespread range.

Growth and development
Tall waterhemp is a summer annual that produces a large number  of very small seeds.  It is considered an r-strategist.  Emergence can span several months and often occurs later in the season than other annual weeds, allowing the weed to evade typical weed control strategies such as herbicide application and tillage.  One study observed 80% emergence not occurring until ten weeks after the initial emergence.  Extreme temperatures have little effect on seed viability.  Germination occurs typically after soil temperature alternation, as this is required to break seed dormancy.  Waterhemp has been found to germinate in a wide range of soil and temperature conditions.  It has been found to germinate 17 years after seed set.

While tall waterhemp cannot self-pollinate, due to having separate male and female plants, it does not require any vectors for pollination.  This allows for wind pollination over large distances, generating a large amount of genetic diversity.  Another factor contributing to genetic diversity is the large amount of seed produced.  Tall waterhemp in competition with soybean has been reported to produce from between 300,000 and 5,000,000 seeds per plant.  Tall waterhemp also has a rapid growth rate, 50–70% greater than other annual weeds.

Interspecific hybridization
Interspecific hybrids of tall waterhemp and Amaranthus hybridus have been observed in experimental fields but have not been observed in agronomic fields.

Agricultural impacts and control
In North America, tall waterhemp is considered a major weed of agricultural fields and other disturbed habitats.  The Southern Weed Science Society includes tall waterhemp on their list of weed species.  However, it is not listed on the federal noxious weed list or any state lists in the United States.  In Europe and other continents where the species has been introduced, naturalization is an infrequent occurrence.

Because of the long germination window for tall waterhemp, a single herbicide application is unlikely to be an effective control strategy. Michigan State University Extension recommends a preemergence application followed by one or more postemergence applications. Some populations of tall waterhemp have been reported resistant to acetolactate synthase inhibiting (ALS) herbicides and the triazines, with some individual weeds being resistant to both herbicide groups. Resistance to acifluorfen and other diphenyl ether herbicides has been reported. Even more alarming is the emergence of waterhemp resistant to the latest generation of herbicides, HPPD inhibitors. Furthermore, waterhemp at a site in Nebraska was found to be resistant to 2,4-D, a phenoxy herbicide.

According to Bob Hartzler of Iowa State University, the most effective control of tall waterhemp is achieved by cultural practices that promote growth of the desired vegetation.

References

External links
 Common Waterhemp // Mizzou WeedID 
 Waterhemp, Common (Amaranthus Rudis L.)
 Waterhemp  Take Action

tuberculatus
Flora of North America
Plants described in 1849
Dioecious plants